The 1980 Gent–Wevelgem was the 42nd edition of the Gent–Wevelgem cycle race and was held on 2 April 1980. The race started in Ghent and finished in Wevelgem. The race was won by Henk Lubberding of the TI–Raleigh team.

General classification

References

Gent–Wevelgem
1980 in road cycling
1980 in Belgian sport
1980 Super Prestige Pernod